Gerardo J. "G.J." Meléndez-Torres is professor of Clinical and Social Epidemiology at the University of Exeter, England and Director of PenTAG (Peninsula Technology Assessment Group).

He is a former student leader at University of Pennsylvania, where he was a grant-recipient and graduate (B.S. in Economics and Health Policy and a B.S. in Nursing). He  was selected as a Truman Scholar, in 2010 and also a  Marshall Scholar in 2011 that served to pursue a MPhil in Evidence-Based Social Intervention at Oxford University, where he subsequently obtained a DPhil in Social Intervention
Previously, he obtained a BSc in Economics (summa cum laude) at The Wharton School, University of Pennsylvania as well as a 
BSc in Nursing (summa cum laude), at the University of Pennsylvania's School of Nursing.

References

External links
Official website

University of Pennsylvania School of Nursing alumni
Marshall Scholars
Alumni of the University of Oxford
Academics of the University of Exeter
Living people
Male nurses
Year of birth missing (living people)